Brian Dobson (born September 9) is a Canadian voice actor, who works for Ocean Studios and various other studios in Vancouver, British Columbia, Canada. He voiced Ben "The Thing" Grimm in Fantastic Four: World's Greatest Heroes, Skeletor in He-Man and the Masters of the Universe, Majin Buu and Dr. Gero in the Ocean dub of Dragon Ball Z, Red Alert in Transformers: Armada and Transformers: Cybertron, Muso in Inuyasha and Martin DaCosta in Mobile Suit Gundam SEED SEED Destiny Zugu, Ronan, Soul Archer, a Ninjdroid Sentry, and Bucko in LEGO Ninjago: Masters of Spinjitzu.

Personal life
Brian Dobson was born in Montreal, Quebec, Canada, but spent most of his childhood in England. He is the youngest of the three Dobson brothers. His older brothers Michael Dobson and Paul Dobson are also voice actors.

Filmography

Anime English dubbing
.hack//Roots - AI Harald
Death Note - Hideki Ide, Kiichiro Osoreda, Rod Ross
Dragon Ball Z - Dr. Gero, Majin Buu (Evil Buu, Super Buu, Kid Buu), Future Gohan, Vodka (Ocean dub)
Hello Carbot - Beatrun
Inuyasha - Muso, Shoga
Kingdom series - Ren Pa
MegaMan NT Warrior - SearchMan EXE, Arashi Kazefuki
Mobile Suit Gundam - Dren, Garma Zabi
Mobile Suit Gundam SEED - Martin DaCosta
Mobile Suit Gundam SEED Destiny - Martin DaCosta, Heine Westenfluss, Orson White
Mobile Suit Gundam 00 - Lee Zhejiang, Bring Stabity, Divine Nova
Ranma ½ - Dragon Whisker Salesman
The Story of Saiunkoku - Courtier #2, Guard #3
Sword of the Stranger - Shogen Itadori
Superbook - Michael the Archangel, Parshan, Joseph, Wiseman # 2, Paul, Boaz, Saul, Workers
Transformers: Armada - Red Alert
Transformers: Cybertron - Red Alert, Clocker
World Trigger - Hyrein
Zoids: Fuzors - Helmut, Dr. Piers

Animation
Chip and Potato - Little Poppa, Aardvark Grandpa, Octopus, Bertie Bumpety-Bump, Farmer Pat
Dinotrux - D-Stroy, Ankylodump #1 (4), Dozeratops
Dr. Dimensionpants - Evil Wizard Silas
Dreamkix - Mr. Krimke
Fantastic Four: World's Greatest Heroes - The Thing
Fruit Ninja: Frenzy Force - Krackleflint
He-Man and the Masters of the Universe - Keldor / Skeletor, Buzz-Off, Webstor, King Hiss, Sssqueeze
Hot Wheels Battle Force 5 - Zorax/Sheriff Johnson
Krypto the Superdog - Lex Luthor
LeapFrog - Additional Voices
Ninjago - Ronan, Soul Archer, Sumo Zumo, Nindroid Sentry, Bucko
Lego Star Wars: The Freemaker Adventures - JEK
Martin Mystery - Boogeyman
Max Steel - Jason Naught / Dwayne
My Little Pony: Friendship Is Magic - Sky Beak
Nerds and Monsters - Zarg, Young Monster #3, Irwin's Narrator Voice, Monktopus
Ōban Star-Racers - Grooor, General Kross, Sül
Pirate Express - Ares
Pucca - Uncle Dumpling
Rated A for Awesome - Max Awesome
Super Dinosaur - Bruce Kingston, Mechanical Dinohead, Dino Man (3), Wannabe Alpha Dino Man, Dino Man #1 (3), Croco Gator, Earth Core Agent (4), Male Earth Core Tech (1), Earth Core Agent #2 (2), Earth Core Agent #1 (2)
Sushi Pack - Unagi
Tarzan and Jane - Shopkeeper, Goon 4
Team Galaxy - Principal Kirkpatrick, Mr. Spoersqlippe
The Cramp Twins - Cougar Ron
The Hollow - Toros, Minotaur #1
The Secret Show - Special agent Ray
The Little Prince - Caracatus (The Planet of Time)
Yvon of the Yukon - Helicopter Instructor

Film
 Bob the Builder: Mega Machines - Thud (US)
Escape from Planet Earth - Hazmats
G.I. Joe: Spy Troops - Flint
G.I. Joe: Valor vs. Venom - Flint
My Little Pony: The Movie - Verko
Ratchet & Clank - Dallas Wannamaker, Announcer, Drek Computer
Sausage Party - Italian Tomato, Lettuce
Slugterra: Ghoul from Beyond - The Goon
Slugterra: Return of the Elementals - The Goon
Underworld: Endless War - Lycan Vregis

Video games
Dead Rising 2: Case:0 - Jed Wright
Frogger's Adventures: The Rescue - Army Frog, Ninja Frog
Frogger: Ancient Shadow – Igunis, Lion Papa
Frogger Beyond - Future Elder, Magic Elder
Kessen - Matabe's Goto, Ankokuji Ekei, Tōdō Takatora, Retainer East
Prototype - Additional voices
Sins of a Solar Empire - Various
Trinity: Souls of Zill Ơll - Dagda, Zofor
Warhammer 40,000: Dawn of War 2 - Space Marine, Ork Boyz
Warhammer 40,000: Dawn of War: Dark Crusade - Earth Caste Builder, Shield Drone, Drone Squad, Flash Gitz, Grey Knights, and Governor-Militant Lukas Alexander
Ys VI: The Ark of Napishtim - Commander Ernst

References

External links
 
 
 
 

Living people
Canadian male video game actors
Canadian male voice actors
Canadian people of English descent
Male actors from Montreal
Male actors from Vancouver
20th-century Canadian male actors
21st-century Canadian male actors
1973 births